International Max Planck Research School for Heart and Lung Research, also known as IMPRS for Heart and Lung Research, is a three-year graduate program offering studies in the field of heart, blood vessel and lung biology. Research areas cover development, remodeling and regeneration, stem cell biology, developmental genetics and translational research. The graduate school focuses on young research with a background in life sciences or medicine.

References

External links 
 

Max Planck Society
Universities and colleges in Hesse